Freyella is a genus of deep-sea-dwelling starfish in the order Brisingida.

Species
There are currently 29 recognized species in this genus: -

Freyella attenuata Sladen, 1889
Freyella breviispina (H.L. Clark, 1920)
Freyella dimorpha Sladen, 1889
Freyella drygalskii (Döderlein, 1928)
Freyella echinata Sladen, 1889
Freyella elegans (Verrill, 1884)
Freyella felleyra McKnight, 2006
Freyella flabellispina Korovchinsky & Galkin, 1984
Freyella formosa Korovchinsky, 1976
Freyella fragilissima Sladen, 1889
Freyella giardi Koehler, 1907
Freyella heroina Sladen, 1889
Freyella hexactis Baranova, 1957
Freyella indica Koehler, 1909
Freyella insignis Ludwig, 1905
Freyella kurilokamchatica Korovchinsky, 1976
Freyella loricata Korovchinsky & Galkin, 1984
Freyella macropedicellaria Korovchinsky & Galkin, 1984
Freyella microplax (Fisher, 1917)
Freyella microspina Verrill, 1894
Freyella mutabila Korovchinsky, 1976
Freyella octoradiata (H.L. Clark, 1920)
Freyella oligobrachia (H.L. Clark, 1920)
Freyella pacifica Ludwig, 1905
Freyella pennata Sladen, 1889
Freyella propinqua Ludwig, 1905
Freyella recta Koehler, 1907
Freyella remex Sladen, 1889
Freyella vitjazi Korovchinsky & Galkin, 1984

References

Brisingida
Asteroidea genera